Lonesome Joe is a Canadian short comedy-drama film, directed by Mark Sawers and released in 2002. The film stars Adrien Dorval as Joe, a lonely tow truck driver whose desire for companionship may be fulfilled when he rescues a dog from being stolen by thieves.

The film premiered at the 2002 Toronto International Film Festival. It was subsequently screened theatrically as the opener to screenings of Isabel Coixet's 2003 film My Life Without Me.

The film was a Genie Award nominee for Best Live Action Short Drama at the 24th Genie Awards in 2004.

References

External links
 

2002 films
2002 short films
Canadian comedy-drama films
Films directed by Mark Sawers
2000s English-language films
Canadian drama short films
Canadian comedy short films
2000s Canadian films